The Heinkel HE 9 was a reconnaissance seaplane developed by the German aviation company Ernst Heinkel Flugzeugwerke AG in the late 1920s.

The aircraft was equipped with 660 liters (492 kW) BMW VI . The planned crew consisted of three people. On 21 May 1929 the plane established numerous world record for seaplanes including a speed record of 231 kilometers per hour in one km of track with a load of 1000 kg. On 10 June HE 9 set a speed record for 1000 km of track with a load of 1000 kg.

Specifications

References

1920s German military reconnaissance aircraft
Floatplanes
HE 009
Low-wing aircraft
Single-engined tractor aircraft
Aircraft first flown in 1927